SON protein is a protein that in humans is encoded by the SON gene.

SON is the name that has been given to a large Ser/Arg (SR)-related protein, which is a splicing co-factor that contributes to an efficient splicing within cell cycle progression. It is also known as BASS1 (Bax antagonist selected in saccharomyces 1) or NRE-binding protein (Negative regulatory element-binding protein). The most common gene name of this splicing protein- which is only found in Humans (Homo sapiens)- is SON, but C21orf50, DBP5, KIAA1019 and NREBP can also be used as synonyms.

The protein encoded by SON gene binds to a specific DNA sequence upstream of the upstream regulatory sequence of the core promoter and second enhancer of human hepatitis B virus (HBV). Through this binding, it represses HBV core promoter activity, transcription of HBV genes, and production of HBV virions. The protein shows sequence similarities with other DNA-binding structural proteins such as gallin, oncoproteins of the MYC family, and the oncoprotein MOS. It may also be involved in protecting cells from apoptosis and in pre-mRNA splicing. Mutation in SON gene is associated with ZTTK syndrome.

Structure 

The sequence length of the SON protein consists in 2426 aminoacids and its sequence status is totally completed. Its molecular weight is 263,830 Daltons (Da) and its domain contains 8 types of repeats which are distributed in 3 regions. This protein is found in the 21st chromosome and is mostly located in nuclear speckles. Its higher expression is seen in leukocyte and heart cells.

Splicing process 

SON protein is essential for maintaining the subnuclear organization of the factors that are processed in the nucleus highlighting its direct role in pre-mRNA splicing.

Splicing is the process through which pre-mRNA is transformed into mRNA. The pre-mRNA which has just been transcribed contains sequences called introns and exons. Introns are non-active nucleotide sequences that must be removed in order for the exons (active sequences) to be joined together forming mRNA. The controlled process of splicing takes place in the spliceosome, a complex that brings together pre-mRNA and a variety of binding proteins. These proteins together with the splicing factors (which are not found in the spliceosome) are in charge of recognizing the 5' ("donor") splice site, 3' ("acceptor") splice site, and branch point sequence within the intron. The SON protein is known to be one of these binding proteins.

Although there is a lack of knowledge about its exact splicing control in the progression of the cell cycle and it has remained largely unexplored, it’s certain that this splicing-associated protein is necessary for the maintenance of the embryonic stem cells because it influences the splicing of pluripotency regulators.

SON plays an important role in the mRNA processing. Nevertheless, this process is still a little uncertain and this is why in a future it will be interesting to understand how exactly this protein interacts with the spliceosomal complex, its exact molecular function in the context of splicing. Not only the SON protein interferes in the splicing but also makes complex mechanisms such as the RNA post-transcriptional to cooperate with the splicing-mRNA processing.

Human embryonic stem cells are able to undergo the process of differentiation into specific and relevant cells. To maintain the pluripotency of the embryonic stem cells, transcription factors and epigenetic modifiers play an important role despite the fact that little is known about the regulation of pluripotency throughout the process of splicing. The factor SON is identified as essential for the maintenance of this pluripotency. It is confirmed that SON regulates the splicing process of transcripts (RNAm) that will encode the gens that are going to regulate the pluripotency of the embryonic human cells.

Function 

On the one hand, SON protein is required to maintain the genome stability in order to ensure an efficient RNA processing of affected genes. It also facilitates the interaction of SR proteins with RNA polymerase II and is required for processing of weak constitutive splice sites, having also strong implications in cancer and other human diseases.

On the other side, a deficiency or knockdown of SON protein causes various and severe defects in mitotic division arrangement, chromosome alignment and microtubule dynamics when spindle pole separation takes place.

But as we could read in the article called “SON protein regulates GATA-2 through transcriptional control of the microRNA 23a-27-24-a clúster”, SON protein has even more functions in the organism. It has been found that these proteins may regulate the hematopoietic cells differentiation. They have a specific job in hematopoietic process, which is based on activating other proteins called GATA. As these ones are finally activated, the cell differentiation starts normally.

Clinical significance 

A recent study suggested that SON may be a novel therapeutic molecular target for pancreatic cancer as the results of a recent study show that this protein is very important as far as proliferation, survival and tumorigenicity of cancer cells are concerned. Specifically, these results revealed that the serine-arginine-rich protein involved in the RNA splicing process, could suppress pancreatic cell tumorigenicity.

References

Further reading